The Crime Syndicate are teams of supervillains from one of DC Comics' parallel universes where they are the evil counterparts of the Justice League. The original team was specifically known as the Crime Syndicate of America and is sometimes abbreviated as CSA. This first superpowered Crime Syndicate team appeared in Justice League of America #29 in August 1964. The primary successive incarnation, known as the Crime Syndicate of Amerika (with the variant spelling of America), first appeared in the 2000 JLA: Earth 2 graphic novel.

A related successive group on Earth-3 is known as the Crime Society of America and first appeared in 52 #52, and was later featured in Countdown to Final Crisis. A "Golden Age" supervillain group, the Crime Society was to Earth-2 what the Anti-Matter Crime Syndicate of Amerika was to Earth-0, until it was removed from continuity following DC's 2011 Flashpoint storyline and The New 52 company-wide reboot. Following this, a singular Crime Syndicate is the Earth-3 counterpart of the Earth-0 Justice League, first appearing in Justice League (vol. 2) #23 (October 2013), and the main focus of the company-wide crossover storyline Forever Evil. The events of that storyline have far-reaching consequences for the DC Universe and for the Crime Syndicate characters who survived and that remained on Earth-0 in one form or another after its events.

Publication history

Crime Syndicate of America 

As detailed in Justice League of America #29 (August 1964), the Crime Syndicate of America originally lived on Earth-Three, a world where history was "reversed" from the real world (e.g., Christopher Columbus discovered Europe, British colonists declared their independence from America, and President John Wilkes Booth was assassinated by an actor named Abraham Lincoln). It initially had no superheroes, only the supervillains of the Crime Syndicate, though this changed with the later introduction of the heroic Lex Luthor who used his vast intelligence for good.

In their first appearance, the Crime Syndicate, bored with the ease with which they were able to commit crimes on their Earth (and with no one to truly challenge them), discovered the existence of Earth-One and Earth-Two after Ultraman got "Ultra-Vision" from exposure to a large chunk of kryptonite and found he could peer between worlds. Intrigued by the existence of superheroes, they crossed the dimensional void and attacked the JLA and JSA. The villains were at first defeated but when they said the word "Volthoom", they sent themselves into Earth-Three thanks to a fail-safe created by Power Ring. The CSA was then able to capture the JSA by transporting them to Earth-Three and imprisoning them, intending to fight the JLA on Earth-2 to prove their superiority (the JLA had a natural advantage on Earth-1 and the CSA had a similar advantage on Earth-3, Earth-2 being chosen as a neutral environment where neither group would have an edge). However, the JLA defeated the CSA by tricking the members into unleashing more power than they could control, such as Ultraman acquiring so many powers he could not use any of them, Power Ring's ring generating constructs that were too large for him to control after Green Lantern gave it a boost, and Wonder Woman allowing Superwoman to 'steal' her Lasso of Truth, knowing that her opponent would not be able to use both of them. Following this defeat, the JLA freed the captured JSA heroes and imprisoned the CSA in an unbreakable bubble generated by Green Lantern's power ring that was placed in a "limbo" dimension between the Earths, where time has no meaning.

Over the ensuing years, the CSA or one of its members would occasionally escape and attempt to wreak havoc on Earth-One and/or Earth-Two. Power Ring, Johnny Quick, and Superwoman battled Captain Comet after being released by the Secret Society of Super Villains.

Ultraman once escaped and collaborated with Lex Luthor of Earth-One and Alexei Luthor of Earth-Two, but was defeated by Superman of Earth-One, Superman of Earth-Two, and Alexander Luthor Sr. of Earth-Three and was returned to his limbo prison.

On one occasion, the entire CSA were released by the time travelling villain Per Degaton when he was caught up in a time storm and stumbled upon their limbo prison. He freed them and they reluctantly agreed to help him take over his homeworld of Earth-Two in his present time of 1942 by stealing nuclear missiles from the 1962 Cuban Missile Crisis of Earth-Prime. When they inevitably tried to double-cross him, a safety protocol he had created hurled the traitors uncontrollably into the time stream, where they landed coincidentally on the satellite headquarters of the JLA in the then-present day of 1982 (the year the story was published). An intricate tale then followed, involving the CSA escaping and the JLA traveling back in time to Earth-Two in 1942 and Earth-Prime in 1962 to prevent the CSA from helping Degaton. It was during the Earth-Two visit to the past that the JLA teamed up with America's superhero team of that era, the All-Star Squadron. The heroes succeeded in stopping Per Degaton and the CSA before their evil plan could be set in motion, effectively wiping these events from existence and everyone's memory.

Earth-Three and the original CSA were destroyed, along with the rest of DC's parallel worlds, in the 1985 12-issue maxiseries Crisis on Infinite Earths. As shown in issue #1, Earth-Three and all of its inhabitants were obliterated by an anti-matter wave that was the catalyst for the story. The original Earth-Three Syndicate made a few Post-Crisis appearances, when Ultraman and Power Ring appeared in the Animal Man series and then again in Infinite Crisis, when Earth-Three was temporarily recreated and models of the Earth-Three Ultraman, Superwoman, and Alexander Luthor Sr. were briefly merged with the Superman and Wonder Woman of Earth-1 and the Superman of Earth-Two and Wonder Woman of Earth-Two.

During the Convergence storyline, the Crime Syndicate had accidentally killed the Earth-Three version of Bruno Mannheim where Superwoman was arrested and sentenced to death. Despite the dome being over their Metropolis, Ultraman, Owlman, Power Ring, and Johnny Quick worked to infiltrate the prison and free Superwoman. Due to the interference of the Rogue Hunters, the Crime Syndicate failed to save Superwoman as the electric chair was activated. As the Rogue Hunters placed the shackles on the Crime Syndicate members, the domes fall around the cities as the Crime Syndicate breaks free. The Crime Syndicate soon found themselves fighting against Justice Legion Alpha from the 853rd Century's Metropolis.

Crime Syndicate 
A Post-Crisis version of the team, simply known as the "Crime Syndicate" (not 'of America'), was eventually introduced. This Post-Crisis version (revealed in 1992's Justice League Quarterly #8) was composed of Qwardians (residents of the antimatter counterpart of Oa) as well as being "more powerful than their counterparts", they are shown to be different from the Earth-Three incarnation by their enlarged eyes, resembling the Weaponers of Qward. They acted as Claire Montgomery's (Maxwell Lord's ex-wife) second Conglomerate team.

Following a further "soft" reboot of DC continuity in 1994's Zero Hour (1994) crossover, the Crime Syndicate was introduced once again, in 2000, in the JLA: Earth 2 graphic novel by Grant Morrison, which combined the Pre-Crisis parallel Earth idea with the Pre-Zero Hour anti-matter universe concept. The Crime Syndicate's Post-Zero Hour anti-matter Earth possesses a "reversed" history similar to Earth-Three's, but with a much darker tone to both the team and its world. JLA Secret Files and Origins 2004 provided additional history of this team, showing that even though they did partially resemble the Earth-Three Syndicate, they were still easily identifiable from their Pre-Crisis Earth-Three incarnation. Unlike the Crime Syndicate of Earth-Three, this Crime Syndicate of Amerika are able to rule their world (a change from their Pre-Crisis counterparts, who were unsuccessful in conquering their world) though they allow governments to continue operating and honest people are able to continue operating in pockets such as Gotham City Police Commissioner Thomas Wayne Sr. (father to Owlman and counterpart of the murdered father of Batman).

Superman later encounters Ultraman, Superwoman and Owlman after a scared and out of control superpowered baby appears out of nowhere. Ultraman and Owlman come to believe the child is the offspring of Ultraman and Superwoman. Owlman wants to kill it out of jealousy, Ultraman wants to raise it as his demented protégé, and Superman tries to save it from them both. When Superwoman arrives on the scene, adamant that she has never given birth, it is revealed that the superpowered infant is actually a reborn Brainiac from the antimatter universe, defeated by Ultraman in the Earth-2 story. Brainiac's sentience is eventually dispersed and the villains return home to sort out their differences.

The Crime Syndicate reappear and lay waste to the planet Qward out of boredom. During their decimation of the planet, the entire Anti-Matter universe undergoes a reboot which causes some immediate changes, the most obvious of which is the sudden replacement of the white Power Ring with a black counterpart to John Stewart, the then-current Green Lantern in the JLA. In the story, it is explained that the reboot the Syndicate experiences is direct fallout from the events of 2003's JLA/Avengers crossover event. Not knowing of these events, the Crime Syndicate journey to the matter universe to attack Earth, blaming the JLA in the mistaken belief that the heroes are responsible for the changes that they have endured. It is during this time that they discover that the reboot of the antimatter universe wiped out the previous 24-hour rule, so the plan is changed to secretly take over the planet instead. Meanwhile, the defeated Qwardians rally behind a dimension-destroying weapon called the Void Hound and pursue the Syndicate to the matter universe, laying waste to hundreds of planets along the way. Reluctantly, the CSA teamed up with the JLA, but the Void Hound proved too powerful. The heroes finally defeated the Void Hound by using a former JLA foe, the Construct, to remove the artificial intelligence of the massive weapon and render it powerless. With the Void Hound defeated and the CSA owing the JLA a favor for saving them, the villains are sent back to the antimatter universe, where they discover to their horror that the Qwardians have also invaded their Earth, dismantling their entire criminal organization and freeing many imprisoned superheroes and rival supervillains.

Superman/Batman Annual #1 (2006) details Superman and Batman's first encounter with Ultraman and Owlman. Set years before Superman and Batman knew each other's secret identities, a vacationing Clark Kent, Bruce Wayne, and Lois Lane meet Ultraman, Owlman, and Superwoman when the villains appear on a cruise ship. This story also features the first appearance of Deathstroke's unnamed antimatter doppelganger. The Ultraman, Owlman, and Superwoman presented in the story have the same costumes as the antimatter universe version of the Syndicate. This tale however is being told by Mister Mxyzptlk and, as such, may not actually be canonical.

After the events of Infinite Crisis, the original Pre-Crisis Ultraman appears in the bottle city of Kandor posing as Kal-El (Superman). It is also revealed that Saturn Queen, last seen in "Absolute Power", survived the reboot of the universe in Infinite Crisis and through flashbacks we learn that she has used her telepathic abilities to convince Ultraman that he is Kal-El and that she is his mother. His original personality seems intact, however, as he is portrayed as being as sadistic and self-centered as ever. Saturn Queen further manipulates events to place him in charge of Kandor and mind controls Kara Zor-El (Supergirl) into marrying him. Kara eventually breaks free and in a blind rage beats him to a pulp (at this point in time, Supergirl was portrayed as being slightly more powerful than Superman). Ultraman is saved when Saturn Queen provides information to Supergirl about her lost home of Argo City in exchange for sparing his life. From this point on, neither the Pre-Crisis Ultraman nor Saturn Queen are seen again and their fates were unknown at the time the universe was rebooted again during 2011's Flashpoint.

Meanwhile, the antimatter CSA made their next appearance in Trinity. Here, it is revealed that the Syndicate have gained control of their Earth again and have been abducting people from throughout all of the individual 52 universes in the current positive matter Multiverse to use as slave labor to repair their damaged Earth. After the hyper-powered Trinity heroes of the story defeat and imprison the Syndicate and free the slaves, the antimatter Earth falls into chaos.

In Justice League of America (vol. 2) #43, Doctor Impossible and his cohorts use extra-dimensional superhero the Blue Jay to open up a gateway to the Multiverse. Owlman, Ultraman, and Superwoman are briefly seen standing atop a building, with shadows obscuring most of their identifying marks, thus making it unclear which versions they are. The full Crime Syndicate members later appear with the original Pre-Crisis iterations of Power Ring and Johnny Quick replacing their contemporary counterparts as a mirror to the events of Green Lantern: Rebirth and Flash: Rebirth. After arriving on New Earth following the destruction of their world at the hands of Alexander Luthor (who had built a weapon of mass destruction that detonated following his demise), the Syndicate attacks the Hall of Justice, where Luthor's corpse was interred after his murder at the hands of Joker during the finale of Infinite Crisis. It is revealed that the Syndicate members were working with Doctor Impossible in order to create a machine that could resurrect the dead, hoping that they could revive Luthor and force him to undo the damage he had dealt to the Crime Syndicate's world. Just as the machine is to be activated, Doctor Impossible double-crosses the Syndicate and attempts to resurrect Darkseid rather than Luthor, but the machine malfunctions and instead creates an immensely powerful villain called the Omega Man.

In the ensuing storyline, Power Ring is killed and the members of the Justice League and the Crime Syndicate are forced to work together to stop the Omega Man. Realizing that the situation is hopeless, Owlman betrays the League and turns them over to the Omega Man, figuring that the Syndicate could take over the League's Earth after the Omega Man kills off most of the heroes. At the last second, Batman reveals that he anticipated the Syndicate's betrayal, and used the Tangent Universe's version of Green Lantern to resurrect Luthor behind the Syndicate's back. Though his resurrection is short-lived, Luthor builds a machine that ultimately sends the Syndicate back to their own ravaged world and seemingly destroys the Omega Man.

Crime Society of America 

In 52 #52, an alternate version of Earth-Three is shown as a part of the new Multiverse. In the depiction are characters that are altered versions of the original Justice League of America, plus the Martian Manhunter. The names of the characters and the team are not mentioned in the two panels in which they appear.

Based on comments by Grant Morrison, this alternate universe is not the Pre-Crisis Earth-Three, making these new characters unrelated to previous versions. In Countdown #31, the name of this team is revealed to be the Crime Society of America. The Society are said to be evil doppelgangers of the heroes of Earth-2, and make their first solo appearance in Countdown Presents The Search for Ray Palmer - Crime Society #1 written by Sean McKeever and illustrated by Jamal Igle. In addition to the five known members, this version of the CSA includes evil versions of the Green Arrow, Wildcat, the Black Canary, Hawkwoman, Stargirl, and the Spectre. Later issues introduce Annataz Arataz (the evil counterpart of Zatanna), and counterparts of Supergirl (Kara Zor-El), Wonder Girl (Donna Troy), and Booster Gold.

Shortly after the Crime Society's introduction, they are offered a place among the Monarch's army. Already recruited into the Monarch's army, Johnny Quick wins a place in the Monarch's elite squad when he defeats his Earth-9 and Earth-2 counterparts in the Countdown: Arena miniseries. All of the Crime Society members who are present in the Earth-51 dimension at the end battle with Superman-Prime and the Monarch are killed, as the entire dimension is completely destroyed with only Superman-Prime and a single plant surviving the cataclysm. The original five members are not present at this battle, though their fates remain unknown.

The New 52 

In "The New 52", with the changes of this new timeline, Crime Syndicate was introduced as the true antagonists of the "Villains Month" event, and the Forever Evil series.

At the conclusion of Trinity War, it is revealed that the leader of the Secret Society, previously known as "the Outsider", was actually an Earth-3 version of Alfred Pennyworth. He gains possession of Pandora's Box to open a portal to Earth-3, from which the Crime Syndicate emerges. The Crime Syndicate then proceeds to attack the fallen Justice League members and claims Prime Earth now belongs to them.

The New 52 line-up of the Crime Syndicate consists of Ultraman, Superwoman, Owlman, Johnny Quick, Power Ring, Deathstorm, the Sea King (who does not survive the trip to Prime Earth) and two new members: Atomica, who had posed as the Atom while working as a mole for the Secret Society, and Grid, a sentient computer virus in a robot body made from Cyborg's old prosthetic parts. The Sea King, however, awakens after his body is placed at the bottom of the ocean. After Power Ring fell in battle against Sinestro, Grid informs Ultraman and Superwoman about it at the time when they are looking for Batman's kryptonite ring. Grid also informs them that the ring has released a pulse that was sensed throughout the Multiverse. Knowing the creature that destroyed their world has found them, Ultraman orders the Syndicate to regroup and heads to Maine with them. Batman, Lex Luthor and their team arrive at the fallen Watchtower and go in search of Grayson and the Crime Syndicate. Grid informs the Outsider of the intrusion and he goes to protect their hooded prisoner over Grayson, only for Black Manta to intercept the Outsider and kill him. Batman, Luthor, Catwoman and Bizarro enter the room with Grayson and see he has been placed in a "Murder Machine" originally intended for Doomsday. They realize that the machine is a detonator for a bomb that can only be stopped if Grayson's heart stops. The remaining Crime Syndicate members return to the Watchtower and attack Sinestro, Deathstroke, and Black Adam. Johnny Quick and Atomica attack Captain Cold and Black Manta, who have unmasked the prisoner and removed the tape from his mouth. Captain Cold fires his cold gun on Johnny Quick's leg and then breaks it off. Back with Grayson, Luthor prevents Batman from saving Grayson, choosing to save the group's lives over Grayson's. As Grayson dies, Batman attacks Luthor for murdering him with Luthor trying to reason with him that he has everything under control. With the hooded prisoner now free, he reveals himself as Alexander Luthor and yells "Mazahs!" to access the dark lightning. Alexander Luthor transforms into Mazahs and kills the injured Johnny Quick, taking his power. After the trapped superheroes are freed from the Firestorm Matrix, Superwoman reveals that the father of her child is actually Alexander Luthor. Mazahs destroy Deathstorm taking his powers as well as attacking Lex and Bizarro, where Mazahs defeats Bizarro. Mazahs is able to pin Lex, who says "Mazahs!", summoning the dark lightning as he sounds like Alexander Luthor. Lex Luthor is able to defeat him once he is back to Alexander Luthor and then kills him. Ultraman begins attacking Lex. As he does, Black Adam and Sinestro move the Moon, causing Ultraman to be hit with the sun, weakening him. Atomica reappears from underneath the rubble, only for Lex Luthor to kill her by stepping on her. Lex Luthor rejoins the heroes and saves Superman by removing the kryptonite placed in his brain by Atomica. In the aftermath, Ultraman and Superwoman are captured, with Owlman still on the loose. It is later revealed that the entity that destroyed the Crime Syndicate's world is the Anti-Monitor, who declares "Darkseid shall be mine".

In the "Darkseid War" story in Justice League, Cyborg and Jessica Cruz, who has partially learned to harness Power Ring's Ring of Volthoom, seek out Superwoman in her maximum security prison for guidance on how to deal with the Anti-Monitor, who has killed Darkseid and now threatens all of existence. Seizing the opportunity to reunite the Syndicate, Volthoom seizes control of Jessica's body and when Cyborg attempts to interface with the ring, has the "Grid" personality re-uploaded and placed in control of his armor. As the trio plot to reunite with Ultraman, the heretofore-missing Owlman shows up and declares that the League and Syndicate must work together to stop the Anti-Monitor. At the climax of the story, Ultraman is incinerated by the Anti-Monitor, ignoring Superman's warnings that it was too powerful to fight alone. Superwoman gives birth to her baby and is shortly thereafter killed by the Anti-Monitor. Having abandoned his comrades, Owlman indicates he never cared for the Syndicate, and his ultimate goal was to sit on Metron's Chair, which would give him all knowledge in the multiverse. He strikes a bargain with Metron and sits in the chair, absorbing its secrets. Suddenly, he becomes aware of a presence but before he can react, he and Metron are seemingly vaporized by a blue light. With the deaths of the last remaining Syndicators, Superwoman's child becomes the sole survivor of Earth 3, paralleling Alexander Luthor Jr.'s survival after the first Crisis.

DC Rebirth 
In 2016, DC Comics implemented another relaunch of its books called "DC Rebirth", which restored its continuity to a form much as it was prior to "The New 52". During the "Year of the Villain" event, the Crime Syndicate is revealed to still be alive along with their universe restored after the events of the "Watchmen" sequel "Doomsday Clock". They decide to align themselves with Perpetua in her conquest of the multiverse, secretly planning to take power for themselves. However, Owlman learns from John Stewart that there have been other versions of himself and thus he can never truly be erased as an Owlman will always exist in the multiverse. Upon this realization, Owlman betrays them and destroys his own world out of jealousy towards The Batman Who Laughs, and his belief that he will inevitably be reincarnated when the multiverse reforms.

Infinite Frontier 
Following the reboot of the Multiverse at the end of Dark Nights: Death Metal as seen during the "Infinite Frontier", a new Earth 3 is created with a new Crime Syndicate with a different origin like Superwoman being Donna Troy, Owlman still being Thomas Wayne Jr. whose parents were killed by a mugger named Harvey Bullock under orders from Boss Gordon who considered them rival crime lords, Ultraman being Kal-El who was exploited by Jonathan and Martha Kent, John Stewart being a former beat cop before becoming Emerald Knight, and Johnny Chambers is a criminal who was raised by a father who trained dogs for dog fighting. The Syndicate is brought together to fight off an invasion by the Starros, paralleling the original origin of the Justice League of America where they possessed characters like Black Siren, Doctor Chaos, Miss Martian, Red Beetle, and Sky Tyrant. The Starros claimed they were not invading but were seeking refuge from the Overlords of Oa, but were nevertheless killed by the Syndicate. Lex Luthor starts to put together a resistance against them called the Legion of Justice that include New God Lonar, her horse Thunderer, Power Tower, Red Hood (Earth 3's Harley Quinn), Savanna, Sinestro, and Venus where their first mission results in the death of Johnny Quick before he can be recruited into the Crime Syndicate. The Legion of Justice were aided by Ultraman's cousin Ultragirl in their fight against the Crime Syndicate of America. During the fight, Sinestro is killed by Emerald Knight, Atomica causes Ultragirl to die from a brain haemorrhage, and a badly-injured Lex Luthor is taken prisoner. One week after the battle, the remaining members of the Legion of Justice ally with Jester and the Crime Syndicate set up their base in the Legion of Justice's former satellite base. The Crime Syndicate holds a press conference advising all metahumans to serve them or else. While Ultraman is upset over Atomica causing Ultragirl's death, Atomica holds Emerald Knight accountable for Johnny's death, and Emerald Knight criticizes Ultraman's withdrawal weakness to Kryptonite and concern over Owlman's duplicity.

Later, the Crime Syndicate comes into conflict with the Suicide Squad, culminating in the "War for Earth-3" storyline, which sees Owlman and Ultraman defeated, with Superwoman, Johnny Quick, and Emerald Knight (now the new Power Ring) now working for Amanda Waller, who converted the Crime Syndicate into a new Justice League alongside operatives in her squad.

Members

Founding members
The following five members founded the original Crime Syndicate of America and have appeared in all additional iterations of the team:

 Ultraman The evil counterpart of Superman. Pre-Crisis, the Earth-Three Ultraman came from a Krypton that had not exploded. This Ultraman also depended on kryptonite to maintain his superpowers rather than drain them (originally receiving a new power through each exposure to kryptonite). Post-Crisis, the antimatter Earth's Ultraman was a human astronaut (Lieutenant Clark Kent) given Anti-Kryptonite-based superpowers after an encounter with aliens. If he is separated from anti-kryptonite long enough, his powers fade away; originally the antimatter Kent combats this power loss by inserting anti-kryptonite capsules under his skin which are released gradually over time, as shown in the JLA: Earth 2 hardcover. Later books state that his increasing resistance level has made this process impractical and he wears the anti-kryptonite in the silver-colored containers along his costume. The antimatter Clark Kent has an unhealthy obsession with his universe's Lois Lane, who is his Crime Syndicate teammate Superwoman, having forced her to marry him and bear him a son, who was later possessed by their version of Brainiac.

 Owlman The evil counterpart of Batman. Pre-Crisis, Owlman possessed a limited range of mind control powers. Post-Crisis, Owlman's origin was fleshed out, with his powers enhanced by a range of technological and physical skills much like Batman's. Post-Crisis, the antimatter Owlman is Thomas Wayne Jr., the older brother of his Earth's Bruce Wayne, who was killed along with his mother. Wayne Jr. blames his father Police Commissioner Thomas Wayne Sr., which has since started a personal conflict between them to the point that Thomas Sr. is determined to kill his own son. Wayne Jr. also increased his IQ with a drug-enhancer for his cerebral cortex as stated in the JLA: Earth 2 hardcover. Wayne Jr. openly possesses plans to counter his teammates' powers. Wayne Jr. uses these counterattacks whenever he chooses, as he causes Johnny Quick to have a minor heart attack at the beginning of the "Syndicate Rules" storyline. Wayne Jr. has had a number of illicit liaisons with Superwoman, though it is not clear whether this is a genuine attraction or just another way of showing her independence from the obsessively jealous and ever-watchful Ultraman.

 Superwoman The evil counterpart of Wonder Woman. Pre-Crisis, Superwoman gained her powers from being like her world's Amazons, and thus has similar powers to Wonder Woman, the gray streak in her hair shows she is aging and thus abandoned her Earth's version of Paradise Island earlier, and her black uniform sans bracelets explains why she seems unhinged, as in Pre-Crisis Amazon lore - an Amazon without bracelets is a berserker and stronger than an average Amazon. Also she is not Princess Diana, but another unnamed Amazon. Post-Crisis, she is the antimatter Earth's version of Wonder Woman as well and has either directly or indirectly killed all the Amazons native to her reality. Superwoman took the name of Lois Lane when she established herself in Patriarch's World. Her birth name has not been revealed at present. Superwoman's lasso does not compel others to tell the truth, but instead releases inhibitions and forces a victim to reveal secrets which they find especially humiliating. The post-Crisis Superwoman also has heat vision and continues an open affair with Owlman, much to the anger of her husband Ultraman.

 Johnny Quick The evil counterpart of the Flash. Pre-Crisis, the criminal Earth-Three Quick was the counterpart of the Barry Allen Flash, though he was not as fast as Allen. He wore an enhancement helmet that augmented his above-human speed, but could not break the lightspeed or dimensional barriers on his own, even with the helmet's augmentation. His specific birth name was never revealed in-panel. Each Post-Crisis Johnny Quick maintains his superpowers with the use of "Speed Juice", a powerful stimulant which was made from the blood of his murdered predecessor. The Post-Crisis Quick's predecessor was later resurrected, and was revealed to be the antimatter counterpart to the Golden Age Johnny Quick.

 Power Ring The evil counterpart of Green Lantern. Pre-Crisis, Power Ring gained his magical ring of power from a Tibetan monk named Volthoom, and has powers similar to the Silver Age Green Lantern. Post-Crisis, the original Power Ring (who still got the ring from a Tibetan monk named Volthoom) was an American named Harrolds, but the JLA: Earth 2 hardcover established that the original Power Ring later gave the ring to a young blond man, the counterpart to Kyle Rayner. His ring was inhabited by the spirit of Volthoom, who often spoke on his own, making inane observations and taking up residence in the ring wielder's mind; all of which is considered a curse to the ring's wielder. The blond Power Ring's favorite tactic in battle was to use the ring to create living Boschian monstrosities capable of destroying whole city blocks. The "Syndicate Rules" storyline showed that after the antimatter Universe was destroyed by Krona and recreated, certain elements of history had been changed, and now the second Power Ring was a counterpart to John Stewart. This Power Ring was a Slave Marine for many years and was tricked by Harrolds into taking the ring by telling him he was the chosen substitute to wield the ring when Harrolds could not.

Qwardian / Post-Crisis line-up
The CSA's Post-Crisis world is primarily governed by the "favor bank", the only rule that is not consistently broken. If any person should grant a favor for someone else, that person is entitled to compensation whenever they see fit, no matter what the cost or hardship to the latter. Failure to pay back a favor results in inordinately harsh consequences, as seen in the beginning of "Syndicate Rules". A mobster, Jackson "Rat-Eyes" Drake, who failed to follow up on a favor owed, was put on "trial" by Owlman, who then had him incinerated by Ultraman as a favor.

A team of Qwardians based on the then-current Justice League International roster appeared on the Post-Crisis/Pre-Zero Hour Earth, although they did not call themselves the Crime Syndicate, even through their predecessors (Qwardian versions of the original Syndicate) did. Its members were:

 Scarab – Blue Beetle's evil counterpart.
 Slipstream – Kid Flash's evil counterpart.
 Fiero – Fire's evil counterpart.
 Frostbite – Ice's evil counterpart.
 Deadeye – Green Arrow's evil counterpart.
 Elasti-Man – Elongated Man's evil counterpart.
 Element Man – Metamorpho's evil counterpart.
  Annataz  - Zatanna's evil counterpart.
  Talon  - Robin's evil counterpart.
 Sea King - Aquaman's evil counterpart.
 Doctor Noon - Doctor Mid-Nite's evil counterpart.
 White Cat - Black Canary's evil counterpart.
 Spaceman - Starman's evil counterpart.
Ultragirl - Supergirl's evil counterpart.
There are other unnamed evil counterparts of Martian Manhunter, Stargirl, Hawkgirl, Wildcat and Spectre.

It is not clear if any of these characters exist in Post-Zero Hour or Post-Infinite Crisis continuity.

JLA: Earth 2 line-up
The JLA: Earth 2 graphic novel featured several costumes in the Syndicate Satellite (the CSA Watchtower).

The Crime Syndicate's members included also:

 White Martian – Martian Manhunter's antimatter counterpart. After arriving on Earth, he became Ultraman's chief rival and was eventually killed by him.
 Barracuda – Aquaman's evil counterpart, though he has a non-human fishman appearance (a fish head and blue skin) as shown in Trinity #12. He is seen leading the armies of Atlantis against the surface world in Florida.
 Blood Eagle – Hawkman's evil counterpart. Killed by the Crime Syndicate.

The New 52 line-up
In addition to the five founding members, The New 52 version of the team introduces five new members:

 Outsider - Alfred Pennyworth's evil counterpart.
 Atomica – Atom's evil counterpart and Johnny Quick's girlfriend.
 Deathstorm – Firestorm's evil counterpart.
 Sea King – Aquaman's evil counterpart, who does not survive the trip to Prime Earth, only to wake up at the bottom of the ocean in Justice League Dark #25. It turned out that he was possessed by Deadman.
 Grid – A sentient computer virus in a robot body made from Cyborg's old prosthetic parts. Unlike his teammates, Grid is not from Earth-3, instead hailing from Earth-0/Prime Earth.
When Pandora was transported to Earth-3, she meets an unnamed counterpart of Martian Manhunter dying.

Infinite Frontier line-up
Following Death Metal, the new lineup features Ultraman, Owlman, Atomica, Donna Troy as Superwoman, Jonathan Chambers as Johnny Quick, and John Stewart as Emerald Knight / Power Ring. After Amanda Waller takes over, Atomica disappears, Ultraman is imprisoned in the Phantom Zone, and Owlman's back is broken. Superwoman, Johnny Quick, and Power Ring are then joined by the Nocturna of an unknown reality, the Superboy clone Match serving as a new Ultraman, fellow Earth 3 native and Black Canary counterpart Black Siren, and the alternate Etrigan known as Etrigan the Brainiac 666.

Other versions
 The "Destiny's Hand" arc of Justice League America introduced an alternate reality created by Doctor Destiny that features a Justice League that became ruthless in the pursuit of justice. The membership consists of Martian Manhunter, Green Lantern, Hawkman, Flash, Atom, Red Tornado, Black Canary, Firestorm, and Green Arrow. Batman was also a member, but resigned when he saw the direction the group was taking.
 In the Elseworlds miniseries JLA: Another Nail, Flash and Atom accidentally teleport to an alternate Earth. They are subsequently captured and questioned by the Crime Syndicate, who believe them both to be the cause of the temporal disruptions affecting the Syndicate's Earth. The heroes observe that the Syndicate's understanding of the situation is flawed because they have a limited understanding of science, so used to just stealing what they want that they haven't truly bothered to understand it. When more anomalies strike this Earth, the Flash and Atom are able to escape. 
 In the JLA Classified story arc "I Can't Believe It's Not the Justice League", the Super Buddies face a villainous version of themselves in the Power Posse, based out of a strip club (as opposed to the Super Buddies' strip mall). Its members include:
 Maxwell Lord
 Sue
 Oberon
 Booster Gold
 Metamorpho
 G'nort (sans power ring, instead a giant monster)
 Mistress Mary (Mary Marvel's evil counterpart)
 Billy (Captain Marvel's evil counterpart)
 Tiffany (Ice's evil counterpart)

In other media

Television

 A group inspired by the Crime Syndicate called the Super Enemies appeared in The World's Greatest Super Friends episode "Universe of Evil". This group consists of evil versions of the Super Friends - Superman, Batman, Wonder Woman, Aquaman, Robin, and Gleek. Additionally, evil versions of the Wonder Twins appear in silhouette. The evil Superman attempts to make Mount Vesuvius erupt despite being hindered by his heroic counterpart, only for the resulting explosion to send the heroic Superman to the Super Enemies' universe. With the help of a scientist from the alternate universe, Superman manages to undo the switch.
 The Crime Syndicate were intended to appear in the Justice League two-part episode "A Better World", but were replaced with the Justice Lords. Following the death of their universe's Flash at the hands of President Lex Luthor, who Superman killed in retaliation, the Justice Lords began ruling their world with an iron fist to end war and crime.
 Robotic doubles of the Justice Lords appear in the Justice League Unlimited episode "Divided We Fall", in which Luthor/Brainiac creates them to fight the Justice League.
 The Crime Syndicate, renamed the Injustice Syndicate, appear in the Batman: The Brave and the Bold episode "Deep Cover for Batman!", consisting of Owlman, Silver Cyclone (Red Tornado's evil counterpart), Blue Bowman (Green Arrow's evil counterpart), Blaze (Fire's evil counterpart), Scarlet Scarab (Blue Beetle's evil counterpart), Dyna-Mite (Atom's evil counterpart), Rubber Man (Plastic Man's evil counterpart), and Barracuda (Aquaman's evil counterpart). Additionally, unnamed evil counterparts of B'wana Beast and Wildcat appear in flashbacks. The Injustice Syndicate capture most of their universe's heroes, but the Red Hood summons the "prime" Batman to help him free his allies and defeat the Syndicate. Cyclone attempts to betray his comrades, only to destroyed by the Red Hood.

Film

 A Justice League DTV was planned, called Justice League: Worlds Collide, in which the Crime Syndicate would have been the main antagonists and would have taken place during the gap between seasons two and three. However, it went unproduced and eventually became Justice League: Crisis on Two Earths.
 The Crime Syndicate appear in Justice League: Crisis on Two Earths, consisting primarily of Ultraman, Superwoman, Owlman, Johnny Quick, Power Ring, and J'edd  J'arkus (Martian Manhunter's evil counterpart). This version of the group consist of the aforementioned members, the "Bosses", with Ultraman as the "Boss of Bosses", and their "Made Men", lower-tier villains who were granted superpowers by the Bosses in exchange for joining the Syndicate, are divided into several factions per boss, and are as follows: Mister Action (Jimmy Olsen's evil counterpart), Black Power (Black Lightning's evil counterpart), Model Citizen (Looker's evil counterpart), Sai (Katana's evil counterpart), Aurora (Halo's evil counterpart), Captain Super (Captain Marvel's evil counterpart), Uncle Super (Uncle Marvel's evil counterpart), Captain Super Jr. (Captain Marvel Jr.'s evil counterpart), Warwolf (Lobo's counterpart), Archer (Green Arrow's evil counterpart), Scream Queen (Black Canary's evil counterpart), Olympia (Wonder Girl's evil counterpart), Breakdance (Vibe's evil counterpart), Extruded Man (Elongated Man's evil counterpart), Vamp (Vixen's evil counterpart), Gypsy Woman (Gypsy's evil counterpart), Angelique (Hawkgirl's evil counterpart), Mary Mayhem (Mary Marvel's evil counterpart), Manhawk (Hawkman's evil counterpart), Mister Horrific (Mister Terrific's evil counterpart), Megamorpho (Metamorpho's evil counterpart), She-Bat (an amalgam of Catwoman and Man-Bat), and unnamed counterparts of Wildcat, Sandman, Blue Beetle, Power Girl, Doctor Fate, Zatanna, Firestorm, Red Tornado, Cyborg, and Swamp Thing.

Video games

 The Crime Syndicate appear in DC Universe Online, consisting of Ultraman, Owlman, Superwoman, and Johnny Quick.
 The Crime Syndicate appear in Lego DC Super-Villains, consisting of Ultraman, Owlman, Superwoman, Power Ring, Johnny Quick, Sea King, Grid, Deathstorm, and Atomica. Following the Justice League's disappearance, the Syndicate disguise themselves as the heroic Justice Syndicate to take advantage of the situation. However, they run afoul of the Legion of Doom, who join forces with the League to expose the Syndicate and send them back to Earth-3.

See also
 Squadron Sinister

References

Characters created by Gardner Fox
Comics characters introduced in 1964
2021 comics debuts
Fictional characters from parallel universes
Fictional dictators
Fictional mass murderers
Justice League